His Picture is a 1916 American silent short comedy directed and starring William Garwood, Violet Mersereau and Clara Beyers. The inspiration that was His Picture came from the ideals of self portraits.

External links

1916 comedy films
1916 films
Silent American comedy films
American silent short films
American black-and-white films
1916 short films
American comedy short films
1910s American films